Austromorium flavigaster is a species of ant belonging to the genus Austromorium. It is a common ant in Australia, and it was described by John S. Clark in 1938.

References

Myrmicinae
Insects described in 1938
Hymenoptera of Australia